Kate Pollitt (born 24 August 1967) is a British rower. She competed in the women's eight event at the 1996 Summer Olympics.

References

External links
 

1967 births
Living people
British female rowers
Olympic rowers of Great Britain
Rowers at the 1996 Summer Olympics
Sportspeople from Norwich